The 1972 Grambling Tigers football team represented Grambling College (now known as Grambling State University) as a member of the Southwestern Athletic Conference (SWAC) during the 1972 NCAA College Division football season. In its 30th season under head coach Eddie Robinson, Grambling compiled an 11–2 record (5–1 against conference opponents), tied for the SWAC championship, defeated  in the Pelican Bowl, and outscored opponents by a total of 346 to 123. The team was recognized as the 1972 black college football national champion and was ranked No. 8 by the Associated Press in the final 1972 NCAA College Division football rankings.

Schedule

References

Grambling
Grambling State Tigers football seasons
Black college football national champions
Southwestern Athletic Conference football champion seasons
Grambling Tigers football